Rivier University is a private Catholic liberal arts university in Nashua, New Hampshire. Rivier is accredited by the New England Commission of Higher Education and approved by the New Hampshire Department of Education.

History
Rivier University, formerly Rivier College, was founded in 1933 by the Sisters of the Presentation of Mary in Hudson, New Hampshire. The congregation named the college in honor of its founder, Anne-Marie Rivier. In 1941, the college moved to its present campus location in Nashua. The university was incorporated in 1935 and granted the authority to offer both graduate and undergraduate level programs. The university is dedicated to Anne Marie Rivier's mission of Catholic social teaching and serving the economically disadvantaged.

On January 15, 1960, Massachusetts Senator John F. Kennedy and his wife, Jacqueline Kennedy Onassis, visited Rivier College shortly after leaving the City Hall Plaza in Nashua, where he held his first event for his candidacy for president of the United States.

In 1991, the college became coeducational, admitting its first male undergraduate students. Rivier College was renamed Rivier University on July 1, 2012.

Campus 
Ut has four residence halls - Trinity, Guild, Presentation, and Brassard - which accommodate 421 students.  

Rivier offers intercollegiate club sports and has a student activities office, a multicultural office, counseling center, career development center, and campus ministry. Rivier has a chapter of Habitat for Humanity. There is a Model United Nations Club, a Business Club, a Biology Club, an Alliance Club (Gay-Straight Alliance), and numerous other organizations. Club membership is open to any interested student. Student clubs and activities are student-run, some with faculty advisors. Club funding is delineated through the school's Student Government Association.

Academics
Rivier University enrolls approximately 2,500 students. It includes the School of Undergraduate Studies, which includes traditional day programs, a Professional Studies Division for undergraduate online and evening programs, and the School of Graduate Studies. Rivier is a member of the New Hampshire College & University Council, a consortium of institutions of higher learning. The university offers traditional courses, online courses, and hybrid courses.

Athletics
Rivier University teams participate as a member of the National Collegiate Athletic Association's Division III. The Raiders are a member of the Great Northeast Athletic Conference (GNAC). Men's sports include baseball, basketball, cross country, ice hockey, lacrosse, soccer and volleyball; while women's sports include basketball, cross country, field hockey, ice hockey, lacrosse, soccer, softball and volleyball.

Lawsuit 
In 1994, Rivier was sued in federal court by Mary Nedder, an assistant professor of religious studies at Rivier, under the Americans for Disabilities Act (ADA) after the university declined to renew her contract because of her weight. Sister Jeanne Perreault, the President of Rivier at the time, allegedly made her views about overweight faculty known and in a report circulated among the faculty stated that "fat teachers do not get much respect from students." Nedder won her lawsuit and was reinstated.

Notable alumni 

 Robert A. Baines - former mayor of Manchester, NH, college professor, educator.
 Skip Cleaver - politician, USMC veteran.
 David Danielson - politician, NH Army National Guard veteran.
 Ivan Edwards (physician) - ex-pastor, USAF flight surgeon, community activist, CEO.
 Donnalee Lozeau - politician, former mayor of Nashua, NH; first female mayor of Nashua, NH.
 Cindy Rosenwald - politician, educator.
 Frank Snow - politician, businessman, USAF veteran, US Customs inspector.
 John Sibley Williams - poet, educator, journal editor.

References

External links

 
Education in Nashua, New Hampshire
Educational institutions established in 1933
Universities and colleges in Hillsborough County, New Hampshire
Buildings and structures in Nashua, New Hampshire
1933 establishments in New Hampshire
Catholic universities and colleges in New Hampshire
Roman Catholic Diocese of Manchester
Liberal arts colleges in New Hampshire